Linus Ölund (born 5 June 1997) is a Swedish professional ice hockey center. He is currently playing with Brynäs IF in the Swedish Hockey League (SHL). He was selected by the Pittsburgh Penguins in the fifth round, 155th overall, in the 2017 NHL Entry Draft.

Playing career
Ölund made his Swedish Hockey League debut playing with Brynäs IF during the 2014–15 SHL season.

Having established career highs in the 2017–18 season, with 8 goals and 15 assists for 23 points with Brynäs, Ölund opted to pursue a North American career, agreeing to a three-year, entry-level contract with the Pittsburgh Penguins starting from the 2018–19 season on 25 April 2018.

In his first season in North America, Ölund was assigned to AHL affiliate, the Wilkes-Barre/Scranton Penguins. Thrust into a defensive checking line role, he found difficulty adapting to the different style of play, producing just 6 goals and 15 points in 61 games.

With the desire to return to Sweden, Ölund was returned to former club, Brynäs IF of the SHL, on loan for the 2019–20 season from the Penguins on 28 June 2019. He made 49 appearances, posting a 4 goals and 14 points. With the season ended prematurely due to COVID-19, Ölund was released from the final year of his entry-level contract with the Pittsburgh Penguins after his contract was mutually terminated on 29 May 2020.

On 1 June, 2020, Ölund was signed to a three-year contract to remain his tenure with Brynäs IF.

Career statistics

Regular season and playoffs

International

References

External links

1997 births
Living people
AIK IF players
Brynäs IF players
Pittsburgh Penguins draft picks
Swedish ice hockey centres
Wilkes-Barre/Scranton Penguins players
People from Gävle
Sportspeople from Gävleborg County